Cybister confusus, is a species of predaceous diving beetle found in India, Bangladesh, Pakistan and Sri Lanka.

Description
It is a carnivorous fresh water beetle commonly found in ponds. Alimentary canal of the adult is highly studied. It is a highly coiled tube with a length of 4 inches and divided into three regions: foregut, midgut and hindgut. Midgut is about one inch long with uniform diameter. Midgut consists with eight blind hepatic caeca.

References 

Dytiscidae
Insects of Sri Lanka
Insects described in 1882